John Howard Comber (8 January 1861 – 1903) was an English cricketer.  Comber's batting and bowling style is unknown.  He was born at Brighton, Sussex and died at Lowell, Massachusetts.

Comber made his first-class debut for Sussex against Kent at Bat and Ball Ground, Gravesend in 1885.  He made two further first-class appearances for Sussex that season, against Hampshire at the County Ground, Southampton and Gloucestershire at the College Ground, Cheltenham.  He struggled in his three first-class matches, scoring just 28 runs at an average of 5.60, with a high score of 8.

At some point later in his life he moved to the United States where in 1892 he is recorded as an "overseer" in his marriage to Lucy Johnson in Lowell, Massachusetts; they had a daughter, also Lucy, in 1895.  He featured in a match for Massachusetts against Lord Hawke's XI in 1894. He died in 1903, but the precise date of death is not known.

References

External links
John Comber at ESPNcricinfo
John Comber at CricketArchive

1861 births
1903 deaths
19th-century male tennis players
Sportspeople from Brighton
English cricketers
Sussex cricketers
English emigrants to the United States